Jorma Korhonen (born May 8, 1958) is a Finnish sport shooter. He competed at the 1992 Summer Olympics in the mixed skeet event, in which he tied for 16th place.

References

1958 births
Living people
Skeet shooters
Finnish male sport shooters
Shooters at the 1992 Summer Olympics
Olympic shooters of Finland